The 2nd Annual European Film Awards, presented by the European Film Academy, recognized excellence in European cinema. The ceremony took place on 25 November 1989 at the Théâtre des Champs-Elysées in Paris, France and was hosted by Franco-Swiss actress Agnès Soral and Spanish actor Fernando Rey.

Hungarian film The Midas Touch and Soviet film Little Vera led the nominations with five each while British film High Hopes received the most awards with three wins. Theo Angelopoulos's Landscape in the Mist received the award for Best European Film.

Italian director Federico Fellini received the Lifetime Achievement Award.

Winners and nominees
The winners are in a yellow background and in bold.

Best European Film

Best European Director
{| class="sortable wikitable" width="95%" cellpadding="5"
! width="20%" |Recipient(s)
! width="20%" |English title
! width="20%" |Original title
|-
|-style="background:#FAEB86"
|  Géza Bereményi || The Midas Touch || Eldorádó|-
|  Theo Angelopoulos || Landscape in the Mist || Topio stin omichli
|-
|  Maciej Dejczer || 300 Miles to Heaven || 300 mil do nieba
|-
|  Vasili Pichul || Little Vera || Malenkaya Vera / Ма́ленькая Ве́ра
|-
|  Jim Sheridan || colspan="2"|My Left Foot
|-
|}

Best European Actress

Best European Actor

Best Supporting Performance

Best Young Film

Best European Screenwriter

Best European Cinematographer

Best European Composer

Best Documentary

Lifetime Achievement Award
   Federico FelliniSpecial Jury Award
  Bertrand Tavernier for Life and Nothing But  Giuseppe Tornatore for Cinema ParadisoSpecial Mention Film / Person
  – Special Mention for the creative spirit of the new films from Sarajevo.  Pictures of the Old World (Obrazy starého sveta) – Dušan Hanák  The Road to God Knows Where – Alan GilsenanEuropean Cinema Society Special Award
  Anatole Dauman'''

References

External links
Official site

European Film Awards ceremonies
1989 film awards
Culture of Paris
1989 in Europe
1989 in French cinema